The Primetime Emmy Award for Outstanding Short Form Animated Program is a Creative Arts Emmy Award which is given annually beginning in 2008 to an animated series or special of 15 minutes or shorter in length. In 2008 and 2009, the category was called "Outstanding Special Class Short-Format Animated Program", and was an "area" award which could have one, more than one, or no, winners; starting in 2010, the name was changed, and it was made a "category" award which (unless there is a tie) must have one winner. Note that a show whose episodes mainly consist of multiple stories, each 15 minutes or shorter, can either enter one story in this category, or a full episode in the Outstanding Animated Program category.

Winners and nominations

2000s

2010s

2020s

Programs with multiple wins

3 wins
 Love, Death & Robots
 Robot Chicken

2 wins
 Adventure Time
 Mickey Mouse

Programs with multiple nominations

12 nominations
 Robot Chicken

9 nominations
 Adventure Time

5 nominations 
 Regular Show
 Steven Universe

4 nominations
 Mickey Mouse 
 SpongeBob SquarePants

3 nominations
 Love, Death & Robots
 Phineas and Ferb 
 Teen Titans Go!

2 nominations
 Chowder

Total awards by network

 Cartoon Network – 4
 Adult Swim – 3
 Netflix - 3
 ABC – 1
 Disney – 1
 Disney.com – 1
 Disney+ – 1

See also

 List of animation awards

Notes

References

Animated Program (for Programming One Hour or More)
American animation awards

tr:En İyi Animasyon Programı Emmy Ödülü (Bir Saat veya Daha Uzun Programlar İçin)